Ivar Karl Ugi (9 September 1930 in Saaremaa, Estonia – 29 September 2005 in Munich) was an Estonian-born German chemist who made major contributions to organic chemistry. He is known for the research on multicomponent reactions, yielding the Ugi reaction.

Biography
After he went to Germany from Estonia in 1941 he began his studies of chemistry in 1949 at the University of Tübingen until 1951. He became Dr. rer. nat. in 1954 at the Ludwig Maximilian University of Munich. He did his habilitation 1960 at the same university. After a short but very successful career in industry at Bayer from 1962 until 1968 when he joined the University of Southern California at Los Angeles.

From 1971 he worked at the Technical University of Munich, and was an emeritus from 1999 until his death in 2005.

Research and development
The one pot reaction of a ketone or aldehyde, an amine, an isocyanide and a carboxylic acid to form a bis-amide is generally known as Ugi reaction.

Major works

References
Curriculum Vitae at TUM 

1930 births
2005 deaths
People from Kuressaare
20th-century German chemists
Estonian chemists
Organic chemists
University of Tübingen alumni
Ludwig Maximilian University of Munich alumni
University of Southern California faculty
Academic staff of the Technical University of Munich
Members of the Estonian Academy of Sciences
Estonian emigrants to Germany
Estonian expatriates in Germany
Estonian World War II refugees
Recipients of the Order of the White Star, 4th Class